Miana is a former genus of moths, including these species:

Miana atomaria, now Ogdoconta cinereola
Miana expolita, now Photedes captiuncula
Miana falsa, now Koyaga falsa
Miana lucasii , now Proteuxoa florescens
Miana literosa, now Mesoligia literosa
Miana palpalis, now Amyna natalis
Miana segregata, now Niphonyx segregata
Miana vincta, now Elaphria chalcedonia

References 

Obsolete arthropod taxa
Moth genera